Jeon Kyu-hwan (born 1965) is a South Korean film director and screenwriter. Besides being the first Korean film to win the 2012 Queer Lion at the 69th Venice International Film Festival, The Weight (2012) also won various awards at film festivals, including Best Director at the 16th Tallinn Black Nights Film Festival and Silver Peacock Award for best director at the 43rd International Film Festival of India in 2012.

Career 
Jeon started his career in a talent management company as a manager for actors such as Cho Jae-hyun and Sol Kyung-gu, before making his directorial feature debut with Mozart Town (2008), followed by Animal Town (2009) and Dance Town (2010). These films formed the 'town trilogy' that shed light on the scars that city leaves on the people living in it and vice versa.

In From Seoul to Varanasi (2011), he experimented with melodrama genre and shot the film in India after being fascinated by the country when he was there to attend a film festival.

The Weight (2012), about a hunchback mortician and his transgender stepsister, won the 2012 Queer Lion, an award for the "best film with a homosexual and queer culture theme" at the 69th Venice International Film Festival. It is also the first Korean film to win the prize.

Filmography 
Mozart Town (2008) 
Animal Town (2009)
Dance Town (2010)
From Seoul to Varanasi (2011)
60 Seconds of Solitude in Year Zero (collection of one-minute shorts created by 60 filmmakers)
The Weight (2012)
My Boy (2013)
Angry Painter (2015)
Supsogui bubu (2017)

Awards 
2011 12th Busan Film Critics Awards: Special Jury Prize (Animal Town)
2012 16th Tallinn Black Nights Film Festival: Best Director (The Weight) 
2012 43rd International Film Festival of India: Silver Peacock Award For Best Director (The Weight))

References

External links 
 
 
 

1965 births
Living people
South Korean film directors
South Korean screenwriters